Andorra is a town and municipality of Teruel province in the autonomous community of Aragon, Spain. It should not be confused with the Principality of Andorra or its capital, Andorra la Vella, 236 km (147 miles) away.

In 2019 the municipality, which covers an area of 141.36 km², had 7,472 inhabitants, giving it a population density of 53 inhabitants per km².

Andorra is the capital of the Aragonese comarca of Andorra-Sierra de Arcos and is located in a region where there is much mining activity.
 
The town's patron saint is St Macarius.

Administration
The mayor of Andorra is Mr Antonio Amador Cueto, of the Socialist party.

References

External links
 Aerial view of the town of Andorra, Teruel Province, Spain (Google maps)

Municipalities in the Province of Teruel